Muhammad al-Baridi, known as Abu Ali al-Baridi and Al-Khal, was a rebel leader during the Syrian Civil War. He founded the Yarmouk Martyrs Brigade, which became connected to the Islamic State under his leadership and which he led until his death.

Biography
Muhammad al-Baridi was born in 1970 in the village of Jamla, Daraa Governorate, Syria. He was born into the Baridi family/clan that is local to the Yarmouk Valley. The Baridis are prominent landowners in the area. His father was a well-known and wealthy landowner working in agriculture and his son followed in his father's footsteps from the beginning of his working life. Muhammad then moved into selling produce in the Deraa markets while not abandoning agricultural work. Due to his wealthy family, he had a relatively good education. He studied Arabic language for a time at Damascus University, though he does not appear to have graduated with a degree.

Ideology
The group he led, the Yarmouk Martyrs Brigade, originally had a nationalist orientation, working in cooperation with Syrian rebel groups. It later switched its orientation to an Islamic one, and it is believed that Muhammad held radical views for many years prior to the outbreak of the Syrian Civil War.

Imprisonment
At some point he was imprisoned by the Syrian government of Bashar al-Assad. The charges he was subject to are in dispute, with claims that he was imprisoned on account of thefts of antiquities from archaeological sites and other claims that it was on account of 'extremist' tendencies.

Two men speaking to Aymenn Jawad Al-Tamimi, an expert in the dynamics of the war in Southern Syria, assert that he had been imprisoned by the regime twice before the revolution- each time for less than a year. It is said that Muhammad al-Baridi desired the implementation of Islamic law before the revolution. Another sources says he was imprisoned because "he was interested in extremist thought" and had been released after the beginning of the revolution as part of the "second amnesty" issued by the regime for a number of political prisoners over some months in 2011. On this reading it is likely he was imprisoned in Sednaya Prison. It is said that he wished to go to Iraq but could not because the Syrian mukhabarat caught up with him.

Death
He was assassinated 15 November 2015, alongside several other members of his top leadership in his hometown of Jamla in a suicide attack carried out by Jabhat al-Nusra.

References

Islamic State of Iraq and the Levant members from Syria
People killed in the Syrian civil war
People of the Syrian civil war
People from Daraa Governorate
1970 births
2015 deaths